Gathering Place (established September 8, 2018) is a 66.5-acre park along the Arkansas River in Tulsa, Oklahoma. Created by the George Kaiser Family Foundation, Gathering Place is a natural space with programming designed to provide inclusive and engaging experiences for all Tulsans to come together to explore, learn, and play. Designed by world-renowned landscape architect Michael Van Valkenburgh, this nearly 70-acre, hybrid park offers free experiences for all ages and abilities. At $465 million, Gathering Place is the largest private gift to a community park in U.S. history.

Pre-opening
A vision of the George Kaiser Family Foundation, Gathering Place was designed to be a vibrant and inclusive space, where diverse communities could come together to explore, learn and play. After years of planning, generous donations, and input from the community, Tulsa's dream became reality in 2014, when construction broke ground on Tulsa's world-class park.

It's no surprise that with such intricate design and complex architecture, the project took several years to complete. Crossland Construction Company managed the build.

Mack Scogin Merrill Elam architects designed the three major buildings at Gathering Place: Williams Lodge, ONEOK Boathouse and the restroom cabana. Each building embraces the park landscape and in a combination of strategies that incorporate Oklahoma's natural materials.

Michael Van Valkenburgh Associates designed the park to be a nature-inspired retreat within a city environment.

Grand opening
Gathering Place opened to the public on September 8, 2018. According to the Tulsa World, Gathering Place officials had planned for the facility to attract a million visitors per year. The actual attendance for the first year was over 3 million people. The two-day grand opening attracted more than 55,000 visitors.

Awards
Tulsa's Gathering Place was named the "Best New Attraction 2019" through the USA Today Readers' Choice awards.  In 2019, Gathering Place also made Time magazine's list of the World's 100 Greatest Places of 2019, National Geographic list of 12 Mind-Bending Playgrounds Around the World, and the American Planning Association's list of six great public spaces in America.  Gathering Place was named the best city park in the nation in a 2021 USA Today readers' choice competition.

Attractions
Gathering Place offers a wide variety of attractions for guests to explore free of charge, including 5-acre Chapman Adventure Playground, Williams Lodge, ONEOK Boathouse, QuikTrip Great Lawn, Energy Transfer Sports Courts, a BMX pump track and skate park, Peggy's Pond, as well as numerous gardens, pathways, and trails. There are plenty of activities for kids and adults alike.

Discovery Lab
Groundbreaking on the anchor project for phase two, Discovery Lab, occurred in February 2020.  The $47 million, 50,000 square foot Discovery Lab main building was designed to be a hands-on museum that would stimulate young children's interests in science and technology topics. The new museum replaces a much smaller facility that opened in the Owen Park Recreation Center in May 2013. The Owen Park Discovery Lab closed in 2021. In addition to interactive exhibits, it would contain classrooms, a café, grand plaza and 300-seat amphitheater. A special parking lot was constructed just south of the building as a convenience for visitors.  It opened January 24, 2022.

"The Gateway" project
City officials announced that they would begin construction of a new pedestrian bridge across the Arkansas River as soon as possible after the Phase I opening.  Michael Van Valkenburgh Associates won a design contest to implement the project, which will be known as "The Gateway". Tulsa River Parks Authority said that the project has been estimated to be completed three years after construction begins, and cost the city $24.4 million.

The project will replace the 1904 Midland Valley Railroad bridge, which had been acquired by the city seventy years later and turned it into a pedestrian bridge.  That bridge was inspected and designated as "structurally deficient".  Demolition started in June 2021 and was expected to take five to seven weeks to complete, given that the bridge had being taken down column by column and section by section.  In related work, the city is spending approximately $50 million to overhaul the adjacent Zink Dam in a renovation that is expected to be completed in the summer of 2023.

Effects of 2019 Arkansas River flooding 

The unusually heavy rains along the Arkansas River caused flooding, especially after it forced major releases from Keystone Dam. This raised the water level downstream above flood stage in many areas and threatened to damage the new Gathering Place, which had opened in the preceding fall, and had to close for a week, until the flood had begun to subside. Gathering Place authorities began to assess the damage and plan repairs.

The east bank of the river experienced relatively light damage, with water covering two of the five sports courts south of 31st Street. After hosing off mud and debris, inspectors found no significant damage to the playing surfaces. However, the flood caused some washouts along the East Bank Trail. At 58th Street and Riverside Drive, it washed away a light stanchion. Matt Meyer, executive director of the Tulsa River Parks Authority, told the press that the washout showed a need to install cable-concrete type bank reinforcement. He noted that a similar project the city had done two years earlier had cost about $1,000 per linear foot.

Notes

References

External links 
 
 Voices of Oklahoma interview. First person interview conducted on December 19, 2020, with Jeff Stava about the planning, preparation, and opening of Gathering Place.

Geography of Tulsa County, Oklahoma
Tourist attractions in Tulsa, Oklahoma
Buildings and structures on the Arkansas River
Amusement parks in Oklahoma
2018 establishments in Oklahoma